The 2009–10 Elitserien season was the 35th season of Elitserien. It started on September 21, 2009 and ended on March 13, 2010. The playoffs started on March 18, 2010 and ended on April 24, 2010. HV71 won the playoffs, beating Timrå IK 4–1 in the quarter final series, Skellefteå AIK 4–1 in the semifinal series, and Djurgårdens IF 4–2 in the final series. The season had a mid-season break that started on February 9 and ended on February 26 to allow participation of Elitserien players in the 2010 Winter Olympics in Vancouver.

In Kvalserien, Södertälje SK requalified and AIK qualified for the 2010–11 Elitserien season at the expense of Rögle BK.

League business

Rule changes
Elitserien will bring in a number of rule changes for the start of the 2009–10 Elitserien season aimed at increasing offence. Two rule changes are to Rule 440 on faceoffs. Firstly, the first faceoff of a power play will now be in the defending zone of the team that committed the foul, regardless of where the play was stopped. Secondly, a faceoff will always be located at one of the nine faceoff spots. In previous seasons a faceoff could have been located anywhere on the rink.

Referees
For the 2009–10 Elitserien season around 100 matches will be refereed by four referees. Also, the referees uniforms will change to the classical black striped shirts with a number on the back instead of the referee's name, as in previous seasons.

Season schedule
Each team will play each other five times during the regular season. Due to play in the Champions Hockey League and matches against two NHL teams, Färjestads BK's and Linköpings HC's matches in round 4 are played out of the schedule. After the initial season schedule have changes been made for rounds 3, 6, 13, 16 and 38.

General managers' meeting
The general managers of the 12 elite league clubs in Elitserien met on June 9, 2009 and agreed on creating a jointly-owned development company that will focus its work on the development of elite ice hockey in Sweden. The company's executive officer is Håkan Loob who will put is work in Färjestads BK on hold. It was also decided that the elite clubs will produce a new shareholder deal for the Swedish hockey league, Svenska Hockeyligan AB (SHL), as the current deal expires on April 30, 2010. The clubs will participate in the current league system for seasons 2009–10 and 2010–11.

Outdoor game
On December 28, 2009, Frölunda HC and Färjestads BK played their round 33 game outdoors at Ullevi Stadium in Gothenburg. The match organizers' goal was to break the previous outdoor game spectator record from 1962 where 23,192 spectators attended a match between Frölunda HC and Djurgårdens IF at Ullevi. In the 2009 match, the boards of the rink were completely transparent and Frölunda HC played in jerseys looking as the jerseys from 1962, void of advertisements. 31,144 spectators watched the game.

Regular season

Standings

Statistical leaders

Scoring leaders 
 
GP = Games played; G = Goals; A = Assists; Pts = Points; +/– = Plus/minus; PIM = Penalty minutes

As of the end of the regular season.

Leading goaltenders 

GP = Games played; TOI = Time on ice (minutes); GA = Goals against; SO = Shutouts; Sv% = Save percentage; GAA = Goals against average

As of the end of the regular season.

Attendance

Playoffs
After the regular season, the standard of 8 teams qualify for the playoffs. HV71 won the regular season title with 95 points.

HV71 – Regular season champions, 95 points
Djurgårdens IF – 92 points (+31 goals for)
Linköpings HC – 92 points (+24 goals for)
Skellefteå AIK – 88 points
Färjestads BK – 87 points
Brynäs IF – 84 points
Frölunda HC – 78 points
Timrå IK – 75 points

Playoff bracket
In the first round, the highest remaining seed chooses which of the two lowest remaining seeds to be matched against. In the second round, the highest remaining seed is matched against the lowest remaining seed. In each round the higher-seeded team is awarded home ice advantage. Each best-of-seven series follows a 1–1–1–2–1–1 format: the higher-seeded team will play at home for games 2 and 4 (plus 5 and 7 if necessary), and the lower-seeded team will be at home for game 1, 3 and 6 (if necessary).

Quarterfinals

Semifinals
In the semifinals, the best ranked team is paired with the lowest ranked team qualified for the semifinals. The two remaining teams will play against each other.

Finals

Playoff statistical leaders

Playoff scoring leaders 
 
GP = Games played; G = Goals; A = Assists; Pts = Points; +/– = Plus/minus; PIM = Penalty minutes

As of the end of the playoffs.

Playoff leading goaltenders 

GP = Games played; TOI = Time on ice (minutes); GA = Goals against; SO = Shutouts; Sv% = Save percentage; GAA = Goals against average

As of the end of the playoffs.

Elitserien awards

References

External links

2009–10 Elitserien season

Swe
2009-10
1